Fredrick James Carter (born February 14, 1945), nicknamed "Mad Dog" or "Doggy", is an American former professional basketball player and coach, who played in the National Basketball Association (NBA) for eight seasons (1969–77) for the Baltimore Bullets, Philadelphia 76ers, and Milwaukee Bucks.

Career
A 6' 3" guard from Mount St. Mary's University, Carter was selected by the Baltimore Bullets in the third round of the 1969 NBA draft. He was traded along with Kevin Loughery from the Baltimore Bullets to the Philadelphia 76ers for Archie Clark, a 1973 second-round selection (19th overall–Louie Nelson) and cash on October 17, 1971. Over the course of his NBA playing career, Carter scored 9,271 points; he was the leading scorer (20.0 PPG) on the 1973 Sixers team that lost an NBA record 73 of 82 regular-season games. Carter later became the assistant coach for the Atlanta Hawks, Chicago Bulls, Washington Bullets, and Philadelphia 76ers, before becoming the head coach of the Sixers for almost two seasons, from late-1992 to mid-1994.

Following his coaching tenure with the Sixers, Carter began a successful career as a basketball analyst for ESPN. During his time as co-host of NBA Tonight he was known for his claim of being "the best player on the worst team in NBA history." He is currently an analyst on NBA TV.

On December 1, 2007, Carter had his jersey, number "33", retired at halftime of the Mount St. Mary's v. Loyola men's basketball game at Coach Jim Phelan Court in Knott Arena in Emmitsburg, Maryland.

Carter is also known for popularizing the "fist bump."

NBA career statistics

Regular season

|-
| align="left" | 1969–70
| align="left" | Baltimore
| 76 || – || 16.0 || .358 || – || .690 || 2.5 || 1.6 || – || – || 5.2
|-
| align="left" | 1970–71
| align="left" | Baltimore
| 77 || – || 22.2 || .417 || – || .650 || 3.3 || 2.1 || – || – || 10.4
|-
| align="left" | 1971–72
| align="left" | Baltimore
| 2 || – || 34.0 || .222 || – || .333 || 9.5 || 6.0 || – || – || 7.5
|-
| align="left" | 1971–72
| align="left" | Philadelphia
| 77 || – || 27.9 || .444 || – || .630 || 4.0 || 2.6 || – || – || 13.8
|-
| align="left" | 1972–73
| align="left" | Philadelphia
| 81 || – || 37.0 || .421 || – || .704 || 6.0 || 4.3 || – || – || 20.0
|-
| align="left" | 1973–74
| align="left" | Philadelphia
| 78 || – || 39.0 || .430 || – || .709 || 4.8 || 5.7 || 1.4 || 0.3 || 21.4
|-
| align="left" | 1974–75
| align="left" | Philadelphia
| 77 || – || 39.6 || .447 || – || .738 || 4.4 || 4.4 || 1.1 || 0.3 || 21.9
|-
| align="left" | 1975–76
| align="left" | Philadelphia
| 82 || – || 36.5 || .417 || – || .702 || 3.6 || 4.5 || 1.7 || 0.2 || 18.9
|-
| align="left" | 1976–77
| align="left" | Philadelphia
| 14 || – || 16.9 || .426 || – || .526 || 1.7 || 1.5 || 0.8 || 0.1 || 6.9
|-
| align="left" | 1976–77
| align="left" | Milwaukee
| 47 || – || 18.6 || .416 || – || .753 || 2.0 || 2.2 || 0.6 || 0.1 || 8.3
|- class="sortbottom"
| style="text-align:center;" colspan="2"| Career
| 611 || – || 30.0 || .425 || – || .693 || 3.9 || 3.5 || 1.2 || 0.2 || 15.2
|}

Playoffs

|-
| align="left" | 1969–70
| align="left" | Baltimore
| 7 || – || 36.1 || .383 || – || .607 || 4.4 || 3.4 || – || – || 14.1
|-
| align="left" | 1970–71
| align="left" | Baltimore
| 18 || – || 33.2 || .415 || – || .644 || 4.6 || 2.0 || – || – || 14.6
|-
| align="left" | 1975–76
| align="left" | Philadelphia
| 3 || – || 41.7 || .433 || – || .867 || 3.3 || 5.0 || 1.3 || 0.3 || 28.0
|- class="sortbottom"
| style="text-align:center;" colspan="2"| Career
| 28 || – || 34.8 || .410 || – || .687 || 4.4 || 2.7 || 1.3 || 0.3 || 15.9
|}

References

External links

1945 births
Living people
African-American basketball coaches
African-American basketball players
American men's basketball coaches
American men's basketball players
American women's basketball coaches
Atlanta Hawks assistant coaches
Baltimore Bullets (1963–1973) draft picks
Baltimore Bullets (1963–1973) players
Basketball coaches from Pennsylvania
Basketball players from Pennsylvania
Chicago Bulls assistant coaches
Guards (basketball)
Milwaukee Bucks players
Mount St. Mary's Mountaineers men's basketball players
National Basketball Association broadcasters
Philadelphia 76ers assistant coaches
Philadelphia 76ers head coaches
Philadelphia 76ers players
Small forwards
Sportspeople from Philadelphia
Washington Bullets assistant coaches
Basketball players from Philadelphia
21st-century African-American people
20th-century African-American sportspeople
Mount St. Mary's Mountaineers women's basketball coaches